United Republic may refer to:

 République solidaire, a centre-right political party in France
 United Arab Republic, a former political union between Egypt and Syria, and the official name of Egypt until 1971
 United Republic of Tanzania, a country in central East Africa
 United Republic of Tanganyika and Zanzibar, the old name for the United Republic of Tanzania
 United Republic of Cameroon, the old name for the Republic of Cameroon
 United Republics of China, a proposed name for a united China
 United Republic of Great Britain and Northern Ireland, a name proposed by some British republicans for the United Kingdom
 "United Republic", the national anthem of Yemen
 The United Republic of Nations, the main setting of The Legend of Korra
 United Republic, a 501c4 organization in the United States promoting "The American Anti-Corruption Act"

See also
 United Federation (disambiguation)
 Political union
 Personal union